A memory debugger is a debugger for finding software memory problems such as memory leaks and buffer overflows.  These are due to bugs related to the allocation and deallocation of dynamic memory. Programs written in languages that have garbage collection, such as managed code, might also need memory debuggers, e.g. for memory leaks due to "living" references in collections.

Overview
Memory debuggers work by monitoring memory access, allocations, and deallocation of memory. Many memory debuggers require applications to be recompiled with special dynamic memory allocation libraries, whose APIs are mostly compatible with conventional dynamic memory allocation libraries, or else use dynamic linking. Electric Fence is such a debugger which debugs memory allocation with malloc. Some memory debuggers (e.g. Valgrind) work by running the executable in a virtual machine-like environment, monitoring memory access, allocation and deallocation so that no recompilation with special memory allocation libraries is required.

Finding memory issues such as leaks can be extremely time consuming as they may not manifest themselves except under certain conditions. Using a tool to detect memory misuse makes the process much faster and easier.

As abnormally high memory utilization can be a contributing factor in software aging, memory debuggers can help programmers to avoid software anomalies that would exhaust the computer system memory, thus ensuring high reliability of the software even for long runtimes.

Comparison to static analyzer
Some static analysis tools can also help find memory errors. Memory debuggers operate as part of an application while it's running while static code analysis is performed by analyzing the code without executing it. These different techniques will typically find different instances of problems, and using them both together yields the best result.

List of memory debugging tools
This is a list of tools useful for memory debugging. A profiler can be used in conjunction with a memory debugger.

See also

Profiling (computer programming)
List of performance analysis tools
Debugger
Runtime error detection
Software testing
Software engineering
Computer programming
Core dump

References
Michael C. Daconta: C++ Pointers and Dynamic Memory Management, John Wiley & Sons, 
Andrew Koenig: C Traps and Pitfalls, Addison-Wesley,

External links
"Hunting Memory Bugs" by Ivan Skytte Jørgensen
"Comparison of Free Memory Checkers" by Jean-Philippe Martin 

Memory management software
Debugging